Jean-Jacques Archambault (March 21, 1919 – December 23, 2001) was a Quebec engineer. He worked at Hydro-Québec and is known for his work on the 735kV electric transmission technology in the early 1960s.

735-kV transmission line
Shortly after being hired as a planner at Hydro-Québec he showed interest in the possibility of 735 kV transmission.  With the highest operational voltage elsewhere being 525 kV
many American specialists affirmed that a 735-kV line was impossible to develop, but the Commission hydroélectrique de Québec approved his idea and launched a project to install a transmission line between Montreal and the Manicouagan-Outardes complex. The 735-kV technology was put in service on 29 November 1965, and described as the technological innovation of the 20th century for Quebec by the Ordre des ingénieurs du Québec.

The Eastern Canada Council of the Institute of Electrical and Electronics Engineers gives out the Jean-Jacques Archambault Award of Merit in his honour, An amphitheatre in the Hydro-Québec Building in Montreal is also named for him.

In 2005, Hydro-Québec received an IEEE Milestone award for the technology.

See also
Hydro-Québec's electricity transmission system

References

2001 deaths
Canadian electrical engineers
French Quebecers
Hydro-Québec
1919 births